The Skellington Chronicles is the tenth solo album by Julian Cope, released in June 1993 on Cope's own Ma-Gog label. It contains the previously released 1989 album Skellington and its sequel Skellington 2, released here for the first time. Skellington 2 was, like its predecessor, recorded in just two days on April 21–22, 1993.

The Skellington Chronicles was re-released as Ye Skellington Chronicles in 1999 with one song removed from the track listing and two bonus tracks.

Track listing

Ye Skellington Chronicles (1999, Head Heritage) 

      
 Notes
"Skellington Anti-Polltax Live in Lambeth, England (Medley)" was recorded at Brixton Fridge, May 1990.
The track "Grimreaper Is a Krautrocker" from The Skellington Chronicles is not included on Ye Skellington Chronicles.

Personnel 
Credits adapted from the album's liner notes.

Skellington 1
Julian Cope - vocals, acoustic guitar (also performed pseudonymously as "Double DeHarrison" playing piano and organ)
Donald Ross Skinner - electric guitar, piano, organ
Mark "Rooster" Cosby - drums, percussion, horns
Hugo Nicolson - horns
Skellington 2
Julian Cope - vocals, guitar, bass
Donald Ross Skinner - keyboards, guitar, bass on "Poppins", drums on "Skip" and "The Angel and the Fellatress" 
Mark "Rooster" Cosby - drums, saxophone, guitar on "Poppins"
Luke Tunney - trumpet
Shaun Harvey - keyboards on "Grimreaper Is a Krautrocker"
Technical
Julian Cope - producer, director, design   
Donald Ross Skinner - compiling, editing  
Mark "Rooster" Cosby - co-director   
Hugo Nicolson - engineer, mixing 
Shaun Harvey - engineer, mixing
Rob Carter - design, artwork
Lisa Bennett - design 
Donato Cinicolo - photography
Cally Callomon - photography

References

External links
The Skellington Chronicles on Discogs.com
Ye Skellington Chronicles on Discogs.com

1993 albums
Julian Cope albums